Álvaro de Oliveira Madaleno Sobrinho (born 1962) is an Angolan banker and businessman.

Early life and education

Career 
After ten years with Grupo Banco Espírito Santo, Sobrinho became one of the youngest ever directors of Banco Espírito Santo (BES) in Lisbon (aged 38) and was subsequently tasked with founding the subsidiary company in Angola, Banco Espírito Santo Angola (BESA). Throughout his time at BESA, the bank received multiple awards, including the World Finance award as the Best Bank in Angola in 2009, and Global Finance Magazine's award as the Best Bank in Angola in 2008, 2009, 2010 and 2011.

In July 2014, Portuguese weekly newspaper Expresso reported that BESA did not know to whom it had extended loans worth US$5.7 billion – around 80 percent of its debt portfolio – during the mandate of previous chief executive Álvaro Sobrinho, who left the post in October 2012.

In 2015 Sobrinho was reported to have beaten the allegations and has continued to battle for compensation from the Expresso news outlet.

In 2013, Sobrinho took charge of Banco Valor Angola as its Executive chairman although later stood down from executive roles to focus on other business investments. Banco Valor is reportedly the 13th largest bank in Angola.

Personal life
Sobrinho holds large investments in telecommunications with YooMee Africa and the media industry with Newshold Group, as well as additional ventures including publishing, manufacturing, retail, travel business and renewable energies. In 2015 Sobrinho was sported to have driven an investment related to exploration drilling in Ethiopia and Kenya.

Sobrinho owns Holdimo, a company with (as of August 2017) the largest private shareholding of Portuguese sports club Sporting CP. In a 2018 interview, Sobrinho said that he and Holdimo would do "everything in their power" to remove the then-president of Sporting, Bruno de Carvalho, from his position, following the poor performance of the football team and tensions between supporters after the violent attack by Sporting fans on the team's players and manager at their training ground on 15 May that year.

Sobrinho is involved with philanthropy in Africa, as the Founding Chairman of the Planet Earth Institute (PEI) in London. The Planet Earth Institute is accredited to the United Nations Environmental Programme and its mission is the "scientific independence of Africa".

In 2015, Sobrinho had been appointed as Business Champion for African Science by the World Bank.

Sobrinho has donated to other Africa-focused charities and programs, including the Duke of Edinburgh International Award and GAVI Alliance.

in 2015, The Planet Earth Institute launched the Planet Earth Institute Foundation in Mauritius, with Dr Ameenah Gurib-Fakim, former President of Mauritius, as its vice-chairman. The PEI Foundation awarded scholarships to Mauritian researchers.

Allegations

Estoril Sol 
Portuguese authorities had investigated Sobrinho when he was the chairman of Banco Espírito Santo Angola (BESA in relation to his use of an overseas company to purchase six apartments in the Estoril Sol Residence complex in Lisbon, Portugal, with an initial payment of €9.5 million.

During the investigations, the apartments were seized by court order, but were later returned to Sobrinho because of lack of evidence.

Monte Branco 
Sobrinho was also a shareholder of Swiss wealth management company Akoya Asset Management, which featured briefly in the Monte Branco investigation into tax evasion.

Sobrinho ordered an investigation from the Swiss authorities, that cleared him and all non-executive shareholders of wrongdoing.

References

1962 births
Living people
People from Luanda
Angolan company founders
Angolan bankers
Angolan businesspeople
NOVA University Lisbon alumni